Telmosena suteri is a species of minute, salt marsh snail with an operculum, aquatic gastropod mollusks, or micromollusks, in the family Assimineidae. 

This species is endemic to Norfolk Island.

References

External links
 Sykes, E. R. (1900). Notes on the non-marine Mollusca of Norfolk and Phillip Islands, with descriptions of new species. Proceedings of the Malacological Society of London. 4: 139-147
 Fukuda H. & Ponder W.F. 2003. Australian freshwater assimineids, with a synopsis of the Recent genus-group taxa of the Assimineidae (Mollusca: Caenogastropoda: Rissooidea). Journal of Natural History, 37: 1977-2032

Gastropods described in 1900
Assimineidae